The Constitution of Tuvalu states that it is “the supreme law of Tuvalu” and that “all other laws shall be interpreted and applied subject to this Constitution”; it sets out the Principles of the Bill of Rights and the Protection of the Fundamental Rights and Freedoms.

Tuvalu's independence was granted to it by the United Kingdom by virtue of the Tuvalu Independence Order 1978 (UK). Tuvalu became an independent constitutional monarchy on 1 October 1978. Charles III - as the King of Tuvalu - is the Head of State, represented by the Governor-General, who is appointed by the King on advice of the Prime Minister of Tuvalu. A written constitution was adopted at independence. In 1986 Tuvalu approved a new constitution that had been developed by the community leaders and the members of the Tuvaluan parliament. In May 2018 a translation of the current Constitution into the Tuvaluan language was completed as part of the Tuvalu Constitutional Review Project.

History of political institutions in Tuvalu

Tuvaluans participated in the political institutions of the Gilbert and Ellice Islands Colony during the transition to self-determination.  In 1974 the Gilbert and Ellice Islands Colony acquired its own constitution. A referendum was held in December 1974 to determine whether the Gilbert Islands and Ellice Islands should each have their own administration.  As a consequence of the 1974 Ellice Islands self-determination referendum the Gilbert and Ellice Islands colony ceased to exist on 1 January 1976 and the separate British colonies of Kiribati and Tuvalu came into existence.

The Constitution adopted on independence

Tuvalu became fully independent within the Commonwealth on 1 October 1978 with a written constitution. John F. Wilson, as Attorney-General, advised on the transition of Tuvalu to independence including attending the Constitutional Conference in Marlborough House in London and visiting each island of Tuvalu to explain the Constitution.

Amending the Constitution and referendums in Tuvalu

Section 7 provides for alterations of the Constitution generally and section 8 addresses alterations of the Constitution to give effect to constitutional changes in the United Kingdom.

In 2008 Tuvaluans rejected a constitutional referendum that proposed replacing the Queen of Tuvalu, with an elected president as the Head of State.

The 1986 amendments to the Constitution

In 1986 the Constitution adopted upon independence was amended in order to give attention to Tuvaluan custom and tradition as well as the aspirations and values of the Tuvaluan people. The changes placed greater emphasis on Tuvaluan community values rather than Western concepts of individual entitlement. The preamble was change and an introductory ‘Principles of the Constitution’ was added. The Tuvaluan values are reflected in the references in the preamble to Christian principles:-

AND WHEREAS the people of Tuvalu, acknowledging God as the Almighty and Everlasting Lord and giver of all good things, humbly place themselves under His good providence and seek His blessing upon themselves and their lives;
AND WHEREAS the people of Tuvalu desire to constitute themselves as an independent State based on Christian principles, the Rule of Law, and Tuvaluan custom and tradition; ……

The revision of the Constitution set out the following principles:-

Principles of the Constitution
1. The principles set out in the Preamble to the Independence Constitution are re-affirmed and re-adopted.
2. The right of the people of Tuvalu, both present and future, to a full, free and happy life, and to moral, spiritual, personal and material welfare, is affirmed as one given to them by God.
3. While believing that Tuvalu must take its rightful place amongst the community of nations in search of peace and the general welfare, nevertheless the people of Tuvalu recognize and affirm, with gratitude to God, that the stability of Tuvaluan society and the happiness and welfare of the people of Tuvalu, both present and future, depend very largely on the maintenance of Tuvaluan values, culture and tradition, including the vitality and the sense of identity of island communities and attitudes of co-operation, self-help and unity within and amongst those communities.
4. Amongst the values that the people of Tuvalu seek to maintain are their traditional forms of communities, the strength and support of the family and family discipline.
5. In government and in social affairs generally the guiding principles of Tuvalu are-
agreement, courtesy and the search for consensus, in accordance with traditional Tuvaluan procedures, rather than alien ideas of confrontation and divisiveness;
the need for mutual respect and co-operation between the different kinds of authorities concerned, including the central Government, the traditional authorities, local governments and authorities, and the religious authorities.
6. The life and the laws of Tuvalu should therefore be based on respect for human dignity, and on the acceptance of Tuvaluan values and culture, and on respect for them.
7. Nevertheless, the people of Tuvalu recognize that in a changing world, and with changing needs, these principles and values, and the manner and form of their expression (especially in legal and administrative matters), will gradually change, and the Constitution not only must recognize their fundamental importance to the life of Tuvalu but also must not unnecessarily hamper their expression and their development.
THESE PRINCIPLES, under the guidance of God, are solemnly adopted and affirmed as the basis of this Constitution, and as the guiding principles to be observed in its interpretation and application at all levels of government and organized life.

The Principles make frequent reference to Tuvaluan values, culture, custom and tradition and draw attention to the importance of the Christian religion to Tuvaluan society.

Tuvalu as a parliamentary democracy

The role of the member of the Parliament of Tuvalu in the parliamentary democracy established in the Constitution, and the ability of a Falekaupule to direct an MP as to their conduct as a member, was considered in Nukufetau v Metia. The Falekaupule of Nukufetau directed Lotoala Metia, the elected member of parliament, as to which group of members he should join and when this directive was not followed  the Falekaupule ordered Metia to resign as a member of parliament. When the Falekaupule attempted to enforce these directives through legal action, the High Court determined that the Constitution is structured around the concept of a parliamentary democracy; and that “[o]ne of the most fundamental aspects of parliamentary democracy is that, whilst a person is elected to represent the people of the district from which he is elected, he is not bound to act in accordance with the directives of the electorate either individually or as a body. He is elected because a majority of the voters regard him as the candidate best equipped to represent them and their interests in the government of their country. He is bound by the rules of parliament and answerable to parliament for the manner in which he acts. Should he lose the confidence of the electorate, he cannot be obliged to resign and he can only be removed for one of the reasons set out in sections 96 to 99 of the Constitution.”  The Chief Justice also considered the question as to whether an MP's customary obligation to obey the commands of the island as expressed by the Falekaupule, overrides the MP's duties to Parliament.

The Falekaupule asserted that customary process known as falaesea (to banishment a person who defied the customary authority of the Falekaupule) provided the legal authority to order Metia to resign as a member of parliament.  The Chief Justice stated that “[i]f the fifth principle of the Preamble is to have any real meaning, it must apply to this case. The Constitution is law for the whole of Tuvalu. It clearly and properly acknowledges the customary role of, and respect for, the falekaupule on each island but, when support for an island's custom and tradition will have a disproportionate effect on the whole country, the island's interests must be subordinated to the national interest. The constitutional preservation of those traditional values is a vital part of present day Tuvalu but I cannot accept that a decision to implement them on one island is reasonable if it will seriously have an adverse effect on the whole country. In the present case, I am satisfied that it was unreasonable for the Falekaupule to ignore the interests of the whole country over an affront to its dignity by one of the island community.”

The Chief Justice went on to state that “the carrying out of those threats by the orders banishing Metia and thus preventing him from properly performing the duties for which he was elected were clearly contrary to the spirit and intent of the Constitution and a totally unacceptable intrusion into the workings of the Tuvaluan Parliament. It should be borne in mind that the supremacy given Parliament by the Constitution is over the country as a whole and must, therefore, take precedence over purely local interests if the latter are in conflict with the national interest. I am satisfied that, as it was a challenge to parliamentary supremacy, it was unreasonable and was thus a breach of the defendant's right to procedural fairness. Similarly, the order of falaesea, although a part of the customary practices of Nukufetau, was so extremely disproportionate to the actions of the Falekaupule in similar previous cases as to be unfair.”

The summoning of meetings of Parliament

The summoning of meetings of Parliament is covered by section 116  (1) of the Constitution which states “Subject to this section, Parliament shall meet at such places in Tuvalu, and at such times, as the Head of State, acting in accordance with the advice of the Cabinet, appoints.”
The question as to whether the Governor General has the power to summon Parliament without, or in disregard of the advice of Cabinet and, if so, the circumstances which could allow the use of that power was considered in Amasone v Attorney General. The Chief Justice stated that “In a country whose Constitution seeks to achieve a fair and democratic government, it must be contrary to the spirit of the Constitution for a Prime Minister who knows that he has actually lost his support in the House to try and stay in power by delaying the meeting of Parliament at which the loss of confidence would be confirmed. … Whether it is unfair or undemocratic will, of course, depend on the circumstances of the case. Thus, in the present case, the Prime Minister could not be said to have flouted the aspirations of section 4 by remaining in power prior to the by-elections in May even though at that time he had clearly lost his majority but, once those elections appeared to have changed the balance of power, it would accord with the principles of fair and democratic government to allow Parliament to decide as soon as possible.”

The Chief Justice then stated “The electorate is entitled to expect its wishes to be reflected in the composition of government as soon as practicable after it has voted. That must apply whenever the result of any election appears to have changed the balance of power in Parliament.”  The Chief Justice concluded by setting out the sequence of events for the Governor General to consider under a. 116 (1) to assist his decision what is the appropriate action to take in relation to the time of the calling of the next meeting of Parliament.

The exercise of political judgment in the calling of by-elections and the summoning of parliament was again tested in 2013. Prime minister Willy Telavi delayed calling a by-election following the death of a member from Nukufetau until the opposition took legal action, which resulted in the High Court ordered the prime minister to issue a notice to hold the by-election. The 2013 Nukufetau by-election was won by the opposition candidate, which result meant that Telavi did not appear to have the support of a majority of the members of parliament.

A constitutional crisis developed in mid 2013 when prime minister Willy Telavi took the position that, under the Constitution, he was only required to convene parliament once a year, and was thus under no obligation to summon it until December 2013.

Tuvalu's opposition then requested the Governor-General Iakoba Italeli to intervene against the prime minister's decision. On 3 July the Governor-General exercised his reserve powers in ordering Parliament to convene.

Sections of the Constitution

Bill of Rights

Part I, Section 3 of the Constitution states that it is “the supreme law of Tuvalu” and that “all other laws shall be interpreted and applied subject to this Constitution”. Section 15 section 15 set out a statement as to how the question whether a law is “reasonably justifiable in a democratic society” is to be addressed.

Part II of the Constitution sets out the Principles of the Bill of Rights and the Protection of the Fundamental Rights and Freedoms; with Subdivision B of Part II setting out special exceptions to those rights and freedoms. In particular Section 29 (1) refer states that the “Preamble acknowledges that Tuvalu is an Independent State based on Christian principles, the Rule of Law, Tuvaluan values, culture and tradition, and respect for human dignity.” Section 29 (3) describes the way in which Tuvaluan values may circumscribe freedoms of the individual to acknowledged community values:

(3) Within Tuvalu, the freedoms of the individual can only be exercised having regard to the rights or feelings of other people, and to the effect on society.
(4) It may therefore be necessary in certain circumstances to regulate or place some restrictions on the exercise of those rights, if their exercise —
(a) may be divisive, unsettling or offensive to the people; or
(b) may directly threaten Tuvaluan values or culture.

The balancing process that is inherent in reconciling the Protection of the Fundamental Rights and Freedoms with Tuvaluan values or culture was considered in Teonea v Pule o Kaupule of Nanumaga. In that case the High Court of Tuvalu, then subsequently the Court of Appeal of Tuvalu had to determine whether the freedoms of belief (s. 23); expression (s. 24) and assembly and association (s. 25) and the freedom from discrimination (s. 27) could be restricted when the Falekaupule (the traditional assembly of elders) of Nanumaga passed a resolution that had the effect of banning the Brethren Church from seeking converts in Nanumaga. The Falekaupule were on the view that the preaching of the Brethren Church was causing division in the Nanumaga community.
Subsequently legal claims were made in the High Court with each claims arising from the problems which followed the establishment of the Brethren Church on Nanumaga. Four people from Nanumaga sued in relation to unlawful dismissal from their employment on grounds that included unlawful discrimination on the basis of religion and that their Constitutional right to freedom of belief, expression and association have been denied by the Falekaupule. Three claims were dismissed, with one plaintiff being awarded general damages and aggravated damages.

The Monarchy of Tuvalu and the Governor General
The Monarchy of Tuvalu exists in a framework of a parliamentary representative democracy. As a constitutional monarch, The King acts entirely on the advice of his Government ministers in Tuvalu. The Head of State is recognised by the Constitution, in section 50, as a symbol of the unity and identity of Tuvalu.  The powers of the Head of State are set out in section 52 (1) of the Constitution.

Part IV of the Constitution confirms the Head of State of Tuvalu is King Charles III as the Sovereign of Tuvalu and provides for the rules for succession to the Crown.  As set out in section 54 of the Constitution, the King's representative here is the Governor General. Section 58 requires the Governor General to perform the functions of the Head of State when the Sovereign is outside Tuvalu or otherwise incapacitated.

The exercise of the Royal prerogative of mercy or 'Power of Mercy' to grant a pardon and the commutation of prison sentences is described in section 80 of the Constitution.

The style and title of Charles III, as Monarch of Tuvalu, is set out in Act 1 of 1987 of the Parliament of Tuvalu as being: Charles the Third, by the Grace of God, King of Tuvalu and of His other Realms and Territories, Head of the Commonwealth. Under the Constitution of Tuvalu, the oath of allegiance is a declaration of allegiance to His Majesty King Charles III, His Heirs and Successors.

The prime minister, cabinet and ministerial government

Part V of the Constitution establishes the executive authority of Tuvalu and confirms that while the Prime Minister is the head of government, executive power is exercised by ministerial government. Part V also establishing the role of the cabinet and the senior civil service positions of the Secretary to Government and the Attorney-General.

The role of Attorney-General is carried out by a trained lawyer employed in the public service. In Tuvalu the Attorney-General sits in Parliament, but does not vote: the parliamentary role of the Attorney-General is purely advisory.

Parliament of Tuvalu

Part VI of the Constitution describes the Electoral laws, the role of the Parliament and the manner of exercise of the law-making power.  The Parliament of Tuvalu or Palamene o Tuvalu is the unicameral national legislature in Tuvalu.  Tuvalu follows the Westminster system of parliamentary traditions, which are modified to suit Tuvaluan political environment. The elected members of parliament selecting the Prime Minister and the Speaker of the Parliament by secret ballot.  The Speaker is the presiding officer of the parliament.

The Ministers that form the Cabinet are appointed by the Governor General on the advice of the Prime Minister.

The summoning of meetings of Parliament is described in section 116 and section 118 addresses the timing of general elections.

The Courts of Tuvalu

Part VII of the Constitution establishes the judicial system of Tuvalu. The High Court of Tuvalu has general jurisdiction and responsibility, as authorised by sections 120 to 133 of the Constitution. The Court of Appeal of Tuvalu is established by sections 134 & 135 of the Constitution to hear appeals from decisions of the High Court.

The Constitution establishes that in respect of decisions of the Court of Appeal, there is a right of appeal to Her Majesty in Council, i.e., the Privy Council in London.

The Public Service

Part VIII of the Constitution establishes the State Services and the general functions of the Public Service Commission. The Governor-General's power to dismiss public servants at pleasure – and the role of the Public Service Commission in the dismissal of public servants - was considered by the High Court in Toafa v Attorney-General.

Parliamentary responsibility for finance

Part IX of the Constitution establishes the office of Auditor-General and confirms parliamentary responsibility for finance and the National Budget. Section 165 (1) states “the raising and spending of money by the Government (including the imposition of taxation and the raising of loans) is subject to authorization and control by Parliament, and shall be regulated by an Act of Parliament.”

The Tuvalu Constitutional Review Project

In 2016 a review of the Constitution of Tuvalu commenced.  The Tuvalu Constitutional Review Project was implemented by the United Nations Development Programme (UNDP) and the Government of Tuvalu. The project reviewed executive/parliamentary relations and Tuvalu's commitments under international law. The project considered the country's socio-economic and political context, such as the sensitivities over political and religious diversity among Tuvalu's Christian and religious minorities. The review of the Constitution of Tuvalu continued into 2021, with funds being allocated in the 2021 Tuvalu National Budget.

References

Tuvalu
Law of Tuvalu